Cyperus amabilis, commonly known as the foothill flatsedge, is a species of sedge that is native to tropical and sub-tropical areas in the Americas, Africa and Asia.

The species was first formally described by the botanist Martin Vahl in 1805.

See also
List of Cyperus species

References

amabilis
Taxa named by Martin Vahl
Plants described in 1805
Flora of Angola
Flora of Arizona
Flora of Benin
Flora of Bolivia
Flora of Botswana
Flora of Brazil
Flora of Burkina Faso
Flora of Burundi
Flora of Cameroon
Flora of Cape Verde
Flora of the Central African Republic
Flora of Chad
Flora of Colombia
Flora of the Democratic Republic of the Congo
Flora of Costa Rica
Flora of Cuba
Flora of the Dominican Republic
Flora of Ecuador
Flora of El Salvador
Flora of Eritrea
Flora of Ethiopia
Flora of Gabon
Flora of the Gambia
Flora of Ghana
Flora of Guatemala
Flora of Guinea
Flora of Guyana
Flora of Honduras
Flora of India
Flora of Ivory Coast
Flora of Madagascar
Flora of Malawi
Flora of Mali
Flora of Mauritania
Flora of Mexico
Flora of Mozambique
Flora of Myanmar
Flora of Namibia
Flora of Nicaragua
Flora of Niger
Flora of Nigeria
Flora of Panama
Flora of Peru
Flora of Senegal
Flora of Sierra Leone
Flora of Somalia